Gautam Vadhera (born 1 October 1972) is an Indian former cricketer. He played nine first-class matches for Delhi between 1992 and 1995.

See also
 List of Delhi cricketers

References

External links
 

1972 births
Living people
Indian cricketers
Delhi cricketers
Cricketers from Delhi